Andrew Hood is a Canadian author. He has written two books of short stories, Pardon Our Monsters (Véhicule Press) and The Cloaca (Invisible Publishing). His most recent book, Jim Guthrie: Who Needs What, is a work of nonfiction published as part of Invisible Publishing's Bibliophonic Series.

Hood's works have won him multiple accolades, including the Danuta Gleed Literary Award for Pardon Our Monsters. His writings has appeared in Maisonneuve, PRISM International, The New Quarterly, and in Joyland magazine.

Hood lives in Guelph, Ontario.

Bibliography
 Pardon Our Monsters (2007)
 The Cloaca (2012)
 Jim Guthrie: Who Needs What (2015)

References

External links 
 Andrew Nathan Hood

Living people
People from Guelph
Canadian male short story writers
Writers from Ontario
Concordia University alumni
Year of birth missing (living people)